Josh Phillips may refer to:

Josh Phillips (actor), American actor
Josh Phillips (musician), English musician
Josh Phillips (murderer), American convicted of murder as a child
Josh Phillips (soccer) (born 1991), American soccer player